Suratgarh Assembly constituency is one of constituencies of Rajasthan Legislative Assembly in the Ganganagar (Lok Sabha constituency).

Suratgarh Constituency covers all voters from Suratgarh tehsil and part of Vijaynagar tehsil, which includes ILRC Jaitsar.

References

See also 
Member of the Legislative Assembly (India)

Sri Ganganagar district
Assembly constituencies of Rajasthan